AACN Nursing Scan in Critical Care was a critical care nursing journal published by NURSECOM, Inc. for the American Association of Critical Care Nurses.

See also
AACN Advanced Critical Care

Publications established in 1991
Critical care nursing journals
Defunct journals of the United States
1991 establishments in the United States